{{Infobox locomotive
|name             = Class Y8000
|powertype        = Diesel
|image            = Gargenville_-_Gare06.jpg
|caption          =
|builder          =  Fauvet Girel / Moyse
|serialnumber     =
|buildmodel       =
|builddate        = 1977–1989
|totalproduction  = 375‡
|whytetype        =
|aarwheels        =
|uicclass         = B
|gauge            = 
|driverdiameter   =
|wheelbase        =
|length           = 
|width            =
|height           =
|weightondrivers  =
|locoweight       = 
|fueltype         = Diesel
|fuelcap          =
|consumption      =
|watercons        =
|primemover       =
|enginetype       = Original :  Poyaud (SSCM)†re-engined :  RVI
|aspiration       =
|displacement     =
|cylindercount    =
|cylindersize     =
|transmission     = Voith hydraulic L2r4sU2
|maxspeed         = line speed  shunting speed towed speed up to 100 km/h
|poweroutput      = engine :  at wheel : ' 
|tractiveeffort   = Starting :   (shunting)Continuous :   @ 
|factorofadhesion =
|locobrakes       =
|trainbrakes      =
|operator         = SNCF
|operatorclass    = Y8000
|numinclass       =
|fleetnumbers     =
|officialname     =
|nicknames        =
|locale           =
|deliverydate     =
|firstrundate     =
|lastrundate      =
|retiredate       =
|restoredate      =
|scrapdate        =
|currentowner     =
|disposition      =
|notes            = Sources : except  †, ‡
}}

The SNCF Class Y 8000 is a class of diesel shunter built between 1977 and 1990.

History and design
The locomotives were developed by SNCF for shunting duties. Initial construction was by Locotracteurs Gaston Moyse until that company ceased business, then by Fauvet Girel.

Y 8000 machines were used to replace older shunting engines, as well as trip work on minor lines.

The locomotives were 2 axle machines with both axles powered by a Poyaud (SSCM) diesel engine via a Voith hydraulic transmission. Locomotives were later re-engined (1997) with lower emission RVI engines; when re-engined locomotives received the green SNCF Fret livery.

The locomotives also are certified for use in Italy, limited to shunting work: Y 8120 has been operated by SNCF subsidiary CapTrain Italia''.

After 1989 production shifted to a mechanically identical Y 8400 type, which incorporated a radio control system for shunting.

References

External links
Fleet list (SNCF): 

Y08000
B locomotives
Diesel locomotives of France
Railway locomotives introduced in 1977
Arbel Fauvet Rail locomotives
Standard gauge locomotives of France
Standard gauge locomotives of Italy
Diesel-hydraulic locomotives
Shunting locomotives